Harris Rosen (born September 9, 1939, in Manhattan, New York) is an American businessman, investor and philanthropist. He founded Rosen Hotels & Resorts in 1974, and serves as the company's president and chief operating officer.

Rosen is widely known in the Central Florida area for his philanthropy, and was named the Orlando Sentinels Central Floridian of the Year in 2011.

Early life and education
Rosen was born in 1939 in Manhattan to Jack and Lee Rosen. He earned a Bachelor of Science degree from Cornell University School of Hotel Administration in 1961. He then served in the United States Army for three years in Germany and South Korea becoming a first lieutenant. Rosen, a descendant of Russian Jewish immigrants, has devoted significant resources to the local Jewish community, donating to and renaming the Jack and Lee Rosen Southwest Orlando Jewish Community Center in 2015.

Career
Rosen began his career at the Waldorf Astoria in New York City as a convention salesman. He also worked at other hotels including various Hilton Hotels and the New Yorker Hotel. Rosen eventually joined the Walt Disney Company as director of hotel planning.

During the height of the 1973 oil crisis, Rosen left Disney and purchased his first hotel, a Quality Inn on International Drive in Southwest Orlando (Orange County; now Rosen Inn International). To market his hotel during this period, Rosen hitchhiked to New England and met with several motor coach companies to gain their Central Florida business. (At the end of one trip, one company offered him a return trip ride with a couple traveling to Florida, if he would provide them accommodations there). That purchase marked the beginning of Rosen Hotels & Resorts.

In 2006, Rosen opened the 1501-room Rosen Shingle Creek, an AAA Four Diamond hotel, his first resort.

In October 2017, Rosen purchased the Clarion International Drive and the Red Roof Inn International Drive.  The next year, he consolidated both hotels under the Midpointe Hotel name, bringing the total number of hotels owned to currently (2019) eight, all in Orlando.

The company's other hotels include: the 1334-room Rosen Centre and the 800-room Rosen Plaza, both connected to the Orange County Convention Center's West Building, Rosen Inn closest to Universal, Rosen Inn at Pointe Orlando, and Rosen Inn International. All are located on International Drive.  The Clarion Inn Lake Buena Vista is located next to Walt Disney World. Rosen Hotels & Resorts owns and operates eight hotels and resorts in the Orlando metropolitan area. The company administers 6,694 guestrooms, has 4,500 employees, and is valued at over $500 million.

Philanthropy

Rosen's philanthropic efforts began in 1993, when he created the Tangelo Park Program to benefit an impoverished Orlando community of the same name. The three-pronged program includes his promise of college scholarships (including room, board, books and tuition) for members of the community who are accepted to vocational school, college or university in the state of Florida. The program includes a parent resource center and ten neighborhood preschools. As of 2016, more than 200 college degrees have been awarded through this program. For more than ten years, Rosen has funded an alternative spring break for about a dozen Cornell students who wish to spend their vacation in Orlando, staying in one of his hotels and mentoring students who live in Tangelo Park.

In the spring of 2016, Rosen announced a program similar to the Tangelo Park Program, albeit five times as large, to benefit the Parramore District near downtown Orlando. The program started with Parramore residents who graduated high school in 2016. In addition, Rosen funded the building and maintenance of a 24-room preschool housed at the Orange County Public Schools Academic Center for Excellence in Parramore which opened in August 2017. Rosen is funding 48 teachers' and aides' salaries, as well as the salaries of two directors.

In November 2017, Rosen announced a partnership with Rollins College, a private, liberal arts college in Winter Park, to provide three annual scholarships to the school to be shared by Tangelo Park and Parramore high school graduates.

In 2002, Rosen donated $18 million to the University of Central Florida to develop the Rosen College of Hospitality Management. He funds hundreds of scholarships annually to students attending the Rosen College.

For years, Rosen has funded sending medical supplies and personal hygiene items to Haiti. In 2006, he hosted the Water for Haiti gala at Rosen Plaza which funded more than 200 water filtration devices. He has also committed to rebuilding hurricane damaged homes—more than 100—which were completed in December 2017. Rosen currently serves as a charter member of the University of Central Florida Board of Trustees.

Awards 
In 2016, Rosen was awarded the Bob Graham Center for Public Service Citizen of the Year award for his work with Tangelo Park.  And was also named the most influential person in tourism in Orlando by Orlando magazine. In November 2017, Rosen was honored by the Orlando Business Journal as the Philanthropist of the Year. The International Drive Chamber of Commerce also named an award in Rosen's name—The Harris Rosen Philanthropy Award—which he received in November 2017. It is awarded annually to those exemplifying his passion for philanthropy.  In June 2022, Rosen was recognized by the International Hospitality Institute on the list of the Global 100 in Hospitality as one of the 100 Most Powerful People in Global Hospitality.

See also

 Rosen Jewish Community Center

References

External links
 Rosen Hotels & Resorts
 UCF Rosen College of Hospitality Management
 The Tangelo Park Program

1939 births
Living people
Jewish American philanthropists
American chief executives of travel and tourism industry companies
American hoteliers
Businesspeople from New York City
People from Manhattan
People from Orlando, Florida
Cornell University School of Hotel Administration alumni
University of Virginia alumni
United States Army officers
University of Central Florida faculty
University of Central Florida Trustees
Businesspeople from Florida
American chief operating officers
Philanthropists from New York (state)
21st-century American Jews